Night After Night is a live album recorded by the British band U.K. It features the trio lineup of Eddie Jobson, John Wetton, and Terry Bozzio.

Recorded in late May and early June 1979 at Nakano Sun Plaza Hall and Nippon Seinenkan, Tokyo, Japan, it is UK's third album and their first live recording, released in September 1979 in support of the band's US tour supporting Jethro Tull (which Eddie Jobson joined after UK's split) and later headlining European tour.

The album was remastered in 2016 and included as part of the box-set Ultimate Collector's Edition, along with an extended version containing nine songs not included in the original album and in actual concert order .

Background
According to Eddie Jobson, the album was recorded at the request of Polydor in Tokyo, originally intended for a Japan-only release, but Polydor in the US were also interested in releasing it. John Wetton explained, "The Japanese record companies, they said that live albums are so popular in Japan right now, that any act coming in, it's almost compulsory to do a live album in Japan, just for release in Japan."

The title track and "As Long As You Want Me Here" do not appear on any studio release by the band.

Track listing 
All songs written by Eddie Jobson and John Wetton except where indicated.

Original album

CD

Extended version

Personnel 
U.K.
 Eddie Jobson – keyboards, electric violin, electronics
 John Wetton – bass, lead vocals
 Terry Bozzio – drums

Singles 
 "Night After Night" / "When Will You Realize" (released in UK/Europe)

The A-side is an edited version of the album track, while the B-side is a non-album studio recording that didn't appear on any CD until the 2016 Ultimate Collector's Edition box-set (although it was re-recorded with different lyrics on John Wetton's solo album Caught in the Crossfire in 1980).

References 

U.K. (band) albums
1979 live albums
E.G. Records live albums
Albums recorded at Nakano Sun Plaza